The Mihai Eminescu Statue is a monument in the Plateau-Mont-Royal area of Montreal, Quebec, Canada.

Overview 
The monument to Mihai Eminescu by Vasile Gorduz was unveiled on September 19, 2004. The event also marked the celebration of 100 years of Romanian presence in Canada and 35 years of Canadian-Romanian relations. The statue is located in Place de la Roumanie (Romania Square), in a small park located between rue Sewell, rue Clark, rue St. Cuthbert and Avenue des Pins.

See also 
 Romanian Canadians

References

External links
 Hommage à Mihai Eminescu 
 Eminescu - Place de la Roumanie - Montreal 

2004 establishments in Quebec
2004 sculptures
Bronze sculptures in Canada
Le Plateau-Mont-Royal
Monuments and memorials in Montreal
Outdoor sculptures in Montreal
Sculptures of men in Canada
Statues in Canada
Statues of writers
Cultural depictions of Romanian men
Cultural depictions of writers
Cultural depictions of poets
Cultural depictions of journalists
Mihai Eminescu